Spanish West Florida (Spanish: Florida Occidental) was a province of the Spanish Empire from 1783 until 1821, when both it and East Florida were ceded to the United States.

The region of West Florida initially had the same borders as the erstwhile British colony. Much of its territory was gradually annexed by the United States in the West Florida Controversy. At its greatest extent, the colony included what are now the Florida Parishes of Louisiana, the southernmost parts of Mississippi and Alabama, as well as the Panhandle of Florida. Whereas Southeastern Louisiana and present-day coastal Mississippi and Alabama were annexed either prior to or during the War of 1812, the land which makes up present-day Florida was not acquired until several years later. It became the Florida Territory of the United States in 1822.

History
Spain was the first European state to colonize the Florida peninsula, expanding northward from Cuba and establishing long-lasting settlements at St. Augustine, on the Atlantic coast, as well as at Pensacola and San Marcos (St. Marks), on the Gulf of Mexico coast.

Following Spain's losses to Great Britain during the Seven Years' War, Spain ceded its Florida territory to Britain in 1763. British administrators then divided the territory into two colonies: East Florida, including the Florida peninsula with the capital at St. Augustine, and West Florida, to which was appended part of the territory received from France under the 1763 peace treaty. West Florida extended from the Apalachicola River to the Mississippi River, with its capital at Pensacola.

In 1779, Spain entered the American Revolutionary War on the side of France but not the Thirteen Colonies. Bernardo de Gálvez, governor of Spanish Louisiana, led a military campaign along the Gulf coast, capturing Baton Rouge and Natchez from the British in 1779, Mobile in 1780 and Pensacola in 1781.

In the 1783 Paris peace treaty, Great Britain returned both Florida colonies to Spanish control. Instead of administering Florida as a single province, as it had prior to 1763, New Spain preserved the British arrangement of dividing the territory between East and West Florida (Florida Oriental and Florida Occidental).  When Spain acquired West Florida in 1783, the eastern British boundary was the Apalachicola River, but Spain in 1785 moved it eastward to the Suwannee River.  The purpose was to transfer San Marcos and the district of Apalachee from East Florida to West Florida.

See also

Spanish Florida
New Spain
British West Florida
East Florida
West Florida
Republic of West Florida
West Florida Controversy
Florida Territory

References

Bibliography
  Reprint, Pioneer Publishing, 164 pp. 
 
Gannon, Michael (1996). The New History of Florida. University Press of Florida. .

 West Florida Collection, Center for Southeast Louisiana Studies, Linus A. Sims Memorial Library, Southeastern Louisiana University, Hammond. For a summary of the holdings see West Florida Archival Collection

Spanish Florida
West Florida
History of Alabama
History of Florida
History of Louisiana
History of Mississippi